Augland is a neighbourhood in the borough of Vågsbygd in the city of Kristiansand in Vest-Agder county, Norway.

Augland may also refer to:
Augland or Aukland, Torridal, village in the Torridal valley in the city of Kristiansand in Vest-Agder county, Norway
Augland or Aukland, Lindesnes, village in Lindesnes municipality in Vest-Agder county, Norway

See also
Aukland (disambiguation)
Auckland, New Zealand city